Santiago Tomás Castro (born 18 September 2004) is an Argentine professional footballer who plays as a forward for Vélez Sarsfield.

Career statistics

Club

Notes

References

2004 births
Living people
Argentine footballers
Association football forwards
Argentine Primera División players
Club Atlético Vélez Sarsfield footballers
Argentina youth international footballers